Charlene E. Cothran is an American journalist and the publisher of the magazines Venus and the defunct Kitchen Table News (not to be confused with the feminist, activist publishing company Kitchen Table: Women of Color Press).

Cothran founded Venus in 1995 in Atlanta, Georgia.  Cothran, a former lesbian and gay rights activist, tailored Venus to the interests of LGBT people of African descent, especially African-American lesbians.

Following a religious conversion to Christianity in 2006, Cothran changed the editorial policy of Venus, and began to promote what is popularly called the ex-gay movement through the magazine.  Cothran claims that her target audience remains the same. Cothran's abrupt renunciation of her activist political views in favor of evangelical proclamations sparked a campaign by the gay community resulting in the loss of advertising revenue.

Cothran went on to form The Evidence Ministry, Inc., an evangelical mission encouraging gays to renounce homosexuality.

References

External links
The Evidence Ministry, Inc.

American women journalists
People self-identified as ex-gay
Living people
Year of birth missing (living people)
African-American publishers (people)
American publishers (people)
American magazine publishers (people)
American Christians
21st-century African-American people
21st-century African-American women